Detron Lewis (born August 20, 1989) is a former American football wide receiver. He was signed by the Tampa Bay Buccaneers as an undrafted free agent in 2011. He played college football at Texas Tech.

College career
He had 55 catches for 730 yard and 5 touchdowns as a junior in 2009. In 2008, he had 76 catches for 913 yards and 3 touchdowns. As a freshman, he had 10 catches for 120 yards and 3 touchdowns. Lewis is from College Station, Texas. He attended A&M Consolidated High School where he played football and was selected as a unanimous first-team All-District 13-5A.

Professional career

Tampa Bay Buccaneers
Lewis was signed by the Tampa Bay Buccaneers as an undrafted free agent on July 27, 2011. He was waived on August 29.

References

External links
Texas Tech Red Raiders bio

1989 births
Living people
People from College Station, Texas
Players of American football from Texas
American football wide receivers
Texas Tech Red Raiders football players
Tampa Bay Buccaneers players